Frederick Manson Bailey  (8 March 1827 – 25 June 1915) was a botanist active in Australia, who made valuable contributions to the characterisation of the flora of Queensland.  He was known by his middle name, Manson.

Early life
 
Bailey was born in London, the second son of John Bailey (horticulturist and first Colonial Botanist of South Australia) and his wife, née Manson. Frederick was educated at the foundation school of the Independent Church at Hackney, London. The family went to Australia in 1838 arriving at Adelaide on 22 March 1839 in the Buckinghamshire. John Bailey was appointed colonial botanist soon afterwards and was asked to form a botanic garden. John Bailey resigned in 1841, began farming, and subsequently started a plant nursery at Adelaide. In these ventures he was assisted by Frederick.

Career
 
In 1858, Bailey went to New Zealand and took up land in the Hutt Valley. In 1861, Frederick started a seedsman's business in Brisbane. For some years, he was collecting in various parts of Queensland, and he also contributed articles to the newspapers on plant life. Bailey married Anna Maria, eldest daughter of the Rev. T. Waite in 1856.

In 1874, Bailey published a Handbook to the Ferns of Queensland, and in the following year was made botanist to the board appointed to investigate diseases of livestock and plants. Consequently, Bailey in 1879 published An Illustrated Monograph of the Grasses of Queensland with Karl Staiger. He was afterwards put in charge of the botanical section of the Queensland Museum, in 1881 was made colonial botanist of Queensland, and held this position until his death. He published in 1881 The Fern World of Australia, and in 1883 appeared A Synopsis of the Queensland Flora, a work of nearly 900 pages to which supplementary volumes were added in later years. This work was superseded by The Queensland Flora, published in six volumes between 1899 and 1902 with an index published three years later. In the meantime, there had been A Companion for the Queensland Student of Plant Life and Botany Abridged (1897), a revised reissue of two earlier pamphlets. Among other works of Bailey was A Catalogue of the Indigenous and Naturalised Plants of Queensland (1890). This was expanded into a Comprehensive Catalogue of Queensland Plants, Both Indigenous and Naturalised (1912), which appeared with many illustrations.

Bailey travelled widely, important expeditions included Rockingham Bay, Seaview Range and the upper Herbert River (1873), western Queensland, Roma and Rockhampton (1876), Cairns and the Barron River (1877), Bellenden Ker (1889), Georgina River (1895), Torres Strait (1897) and British New Guinea (1898). Bailey was awarded the Clarke Medal of the Royal Society of New South Wales in 1902, and was created C.M.G. in 1911. Bailey died on 25 June 1915 at Kangaroo Point, Brisbane. He is buried in South Brisbane Cemetery.

Legacy

Bailey's name has been attached to about 50 species of plants by fellow botanists, such as Acacia baileyana and Grevillea baileyana. A son, John Frederick Bailey, who survived him, was director of the Brisbane and then Adelaide botanic gardens.

References

E. N. Marks, 'Bailey, Frederick Manson (1827 - 1915)', Australian Dictionary of Biography, Volume 3, MUP, 1969, pp 73–74.

Australian National Botanic Garden; Bailey, Frederick M.  (1827-1915)

External links
View works by F.M. Bailey at Biodiversity Heritage Library.
Entry for F.M. Bailey in Taxonomic Literature II Online.

20th-century Australian botanists
Pteridologists
1827 births
1915 deaths
Companions of the Order of St Michael and St George
19th-century British botanists